Raul Augusto de Almeida Solnado  (19 October 1929 - 8 August 2009) was a popular Portuguese actor and comedian. He was born in Lisbon's Madragoa neighborhood, and first appeared on stage there. In his long career, he developed many comic pieces that have become classics.

His humour was, at the time (especially considering Portugal was still under the dictatorial Salazar regime), both unexpected and fresh. It included a lot of nonsense, and stories making fun of daily life.

He often played an ingenuous poor man, whose life was neither good or bad. He portrayed characters with conviction and humor. His best material included pieces written by him, such as "Ida ao médico" ("At the doctor"), and others based on Spanish comedian Miguel Gila’s material: (“A guerra de 1908” / “The war of 1908” and “História da minha vida” / “The story of my life”).

Example

As a first-time patient in hospital, addressing to a nurse (from “At the doctor”):

Solnado hosted Portugal's first talk show, in 1969, alongside Carlos Cruz and Fialho Gouveia. The show, called Zip Zip is still considered a landmark in the history of Portuguese television.

He died on 8 August 2009 of heart disease.

Distinctions

National orders
 Grand Cross of the Order of Prince Henry the Navigator (9 June 2004)
 Officer of the Order of Prince Henry the Navigator (9 June 1982)

References

External links
 

1929 births
2009 deaths
Golden Globes (Portugal) winners
Portuguese male comedians
Portuguese male film actors
Portuguese male television actors
Portuguese television presenters
Male actors from Lisbon
20th-century comedians
Grand Crosses of the Order of Prince Henry
Officers of the Order of Prince Henry